High Hesleden is a village in County Durham, in England. It is situated a few miles north of Hartlepool, between Blackhall Rocks and Hesleden.

High Hesleden is located mostly along one street, on one side of which lies the village green; there is a turn off (although difficult to recognise), for Monk Hesleden and there is a small country lane which takes you down to Crimdon, passing the Tweddle Blackhalls Farm (which is open to the public). There is a public house, The Ship Inn, which is located centrally, by the village green.  The Ship Inn has since closed until further notice

References

Villages in County Durham